Mordellistena hidakai is a beetle in the genus Mordellistena of the family Mordellidae. It was described in 1963 by Nomura.

References

hidakai
Beetles described in 1963